The 2007 Chadron State Eagles football team represented Chadron State College as a member of the Rocky Mountain Athletic Conference (RMAC) during the 2007 NCAA Division II football season. Led by head coach Bill O'Boyle and record-setting running back and Harlon Hill Trophy winner Danny Woodhead, the Eagles compiled an overall record of 12–1 with a mark of 8–0 in conference play, winning the RMAC title. After an 11–0 regular season, Chadron State advanced to the NCAA Division II Football Championship playoffs and received a first-round bye. The Eagles beat Abilene Christian in the second round in triple overtime by a score of 76–73. It was the highest scoring game in NCAA football history.

Schedule

References

Chadron State
Chadron State Eagles football seasons
Rocky Mountain Athletic Conference football champion seasons
Chadron State Eagles football